Skotniki may refer to the following places in Poland:
Skotniki, part of the Dębniki district of Kraków
Skotniki, Greater Poland Voivodeship (west-central Poland)
Skotniki, Kuyavian-Pomeranian Voivodeship (north-central Poland)
Skotniki, Piotrków County in Łódź Voivodeship (central Poland)
Skotniki, Poddębice County in Łódź Voivodeship (central Poland)
Skotniki, Gmina Ozorków in Łódź Voivodeship (central Poland)
Skotniki, Gmina Zgierz in Łódź Voivodeship (central Poland)
Skotniki, Lower Silesian Voivodeship (south-west Poland)
Skotniki, Masovian Voivodeship (east-central Poland)
Skotniki, Świętokrzyskie Voivodeship (south-central Poland)
Skotniki, Drawsko County in West Pomeranian Voivodeship (north-west Poland)
Skotniki, Gryfino County in West Pomeranian Voivodeship (north-west Poland)
Skotniki, Szczecinek County in West Pomeranian Voivodeship (north-west Poland)